Bedeva paivae is a species of sea snail, a marine gastropod mollusc in the family Muricidae, the murex snails or rock snails.

Description

Distribution
The holotype of this marine species was found off Antarctica between the Isles Saint Paul and Amsterdam.

References

 Velain, C., 1876. Zoologie: sur la faune malacologique des îles Saint Paul et Amsterdam. Comptes Rendus Hebdomadaires des Séances de l'Académie des Sciences 83(4): 284–287 (nomen nudum)
 Velain, C., 1877. Description des mollusques. Archives de Zoologie Expérimentale et Générale 6: 98–144
 Fischer-Piette, E. & Beigbeder, J., 1943. Catalogue des types de gastéropodes marins conservés au laboratoire de Malacologie. II. - Tritonalia ; Thyphis ; Trophon. Bulletin du Muséum national d'Histoire naturelle 2° série, 15(5): 324–328

External links
 Syntype at MNHN, Paris

Bedeva
Gastropods described in 1864